Mamuil Malal Pass (Mapudungun for corral of wooden sticks) is an international mountain pass in the Andes between Chile and Argentina. The pass connects Pucón and Curarrehue in Chile with Junín de los Andes in Argentina.  The road passes just north of Lanín Volcano. During winter the pass may close due to heavy snowfalls. From the Chilean side the pass is accessed through Route 199-CH, branch line which begins at the Panamerican Highway near Freire.

References

Argentina–Chile border crossings
Landforms of Araucanía Region
Transport in La Araucanía Region
Landforms of Neuquén Province
Mountain passes of the Andes
Mountain passes of Argentina
Mountain passes of Chile